Raspoutine is a 2011 Franco-Russian historical drama television film directed by Josée Dayan and starring Gérard Depardieu, Fanny Ardant, Vladimir Mashkov and Anna Mikhalkova. It centers on the last year in the life of the Russian historical figure Grigori Rasputin.

Plot
Exhausted by the First World War and shaken by internal social and political instability, the Russian Empire slowly and inexorably moves toward its collapse. Some of the well-born aristocrats and members of royal family decide that the only way to save the country is to expel the famous seer and healer Grigori Rasputin from St. Petersburg. This is a simple Russian man without any formal titles, but Rasputin is very friendly with the Emperor and his wife and has a huge influence on them.

Princess Zinaida Yusupova tries to explain to Empress Alexandra Feodorovna the harmfulness of her friendship with Rasputin, trying to prove that Rasputin terribly discredits not only the entire royal power, but also the Empress personally. Rasputin, however, regularly cures the only son of the Empress from attacks of haemophilia, and therefore Alexandra never drives out "the holy elder". Seeing that her entreaties are useless, Princess Yusupova decides to act alone. She persuades her son Felix to organize a plot to murder Rasputin.

Cast
 Gérard Depardieu – Grigori Rasputin (Russian voice by Sergei Garmash)
 Fanny Ardant – Russian Empress Alexandra Feodorovna (Russian voice by Marina Neyolova)
 Vladimir Mashkov – Russian Emperor Nicholas II of Russia
 Anna Mikhalkova – Anna Vyrubova 
 Irina Alfyorova – Zinaida Yusupova 
 Filipp Yankovsky – Felix Yusupov 
 Natalya Shvets – Irina Yusupova 
 Leonid Mozgovoy – Makary the priest
 Danila Kozlovsky – Grand Duke Dmitri Pavlovich of Russia 
 Konstantin Khabensky – Aron Simanovich, Rasputin's personal secretary
 Kseniya Rappoport – Maria ("Munya") Golovina, Rasputin's votaress and secretary
 Yuliya Snigir – Dora 
 Yuri Kolokolnikov – Oswald Rayner
 Igor Sergeyev – Vladimir Purishkevich 
 Sergey Zamorev – Boris Stürmer 
 Ernst Romanov – George Buchanan 
 Petr Gavrilyuk – Eugene Botkin 
 Tamara Kolesnikova – Dowager Russian Empress Maria Feodorovna
 Victor Kostetskiy – archimandrite
 Alexander Ryazantsev – Russian Grand Duke Nikolai Nikolaevich

Production
The main shooting for the film took place in Russia, particularly in Saint Petersburg (Smolny Convent and Moika Palace), Pushkin (Catherine Palace and the Alexander Palace. Some scenes of the film were shot in Marseille.

According to Gérard Depardieu, some changes to the film's script were made personally by Vladimir Putin.

References

External links

2011 television films
2011 films
2010s biographical films
Russian biographical films
French biographical films
2010s Russian-language films
Mosfilm films
Russian multilingual films
French multilingual films
2011 multilingual films
Films directed by Josée Dayan
2010s French films